The Thirsty Traveler, executive produced by Bryan Smith, is a weekly journey into the heart of the world's greatest wine, beer, and spirit producing regions.  Each episode explores the land, people, production, companies, customs, traditions, food, and stories connected with the alcoholic beverage that a region is known for.

The Thirsty Traveler was created by Susan Cardinal and produced by Grasslands Entertainment.

Episodes

Season 1

Season 2

Season 3

Season 4

Season 5

Networks

The Thirsty Traveler was broadcast on the following networks:

 A&E Mundo
 BBC Food
 BBC Canada
 Canal Évasion
 Discovery Travel and Adventure Channel
 The Cooking Channel
 Food Network Canada
 HBO Central Europe
 Travel Channel
 Travel Channel UK
 National Geographic Channel
 Discovery Civilization

Countries

The Thirsty Traveler was seen by an estimated audience in excess of 300 million viewers across six continents in over 70 countries around the world, including:

 Australia
 Canada
 Great Britain
 Japan
 Korea
 New Zealand
 Portugal
 South Africa
 United States

External links
 The Thirsty Traveler (IMDB)

References

Food travelogue television series
Canadian travel television series
Food Network (Canadian TV channel) original programming
2002 Canadian television series debuts
2000s Canadian reality television series
2006 Canadian television series endings